Deathblow is a fictional character in the . He first appears in Darker Image #1 (March 1993) and was created by Jim Lee and Brandon Choi.

Fictional character biography
Michael Cray was born to U.S. Navy Admiral Phillip James Cray and Elizabeth Cray. He has a brother named Alexander. Michael Cray's daughter is Rachel Goldman, a.k.a. Sublime, a member of DV8. After his parents were slain by terrorists, he joins the U.S. military to avenge their deaths. He became a Navy SEAL prior to being transferred to International Operation's newly formed Team 7. Like all members of that group, he was a highly experienced Special Forces operative. The team had been sent on a mission (or so they believed), when in reality they were sent to be exposed to the Gen Factor by Miles Craven (head of I.O.).  Unlike the other surviving members of Team 7 (not everyone survived the exposure to the gen factor treatment), Michael's powers did not manifest until many years later. Despite the lack of power, he would fight for his teammates, such as taking a Naval officer hostage when the other powered members of Team 7 were literally being nuked as a test (they got through, though). When the majority of Team 7 went underground (with their families), Cray continues to serve I.O. (as did Lynch, Dane and Backlash). Miles Craven assigns Cray to the Special Operations Group. He did many wetwork and blackbag assignments for them.

Michael Cray left I.O. when he was diagnosed with a brain tumor. He wanted to atone himself for all the innocent men and women he had killed during his missions. He got his chance when he became involved with the Order of the Cross. Their adversary, the Black Angel, awoke a demonic entity bent on killing a young boy with miraculous abilities. It turned out that Cray's cancer was, in fact, a result of the Gen-Factor, giving him regenerative abilities. It would also give him the ability to manifest psionic shields to protect himself, but he could not control it and was not even aware it existed. Cray defeated the Black Angel with the help of Sister Mary, a former police officer turned nun, Gabrielle D'Angelo, his ex-wife who had become a vessel for the archangel Gabriel, and several of his Team 7 colleagues. After the death of the Black Angel, the young child restored the damage he had done by rewriting reality, but in the new reality, Gabrielle had died during their honeymoon.

Michael spends time working for Rayna Masters, who ran a bodyguard agency called 'Executive Protection Services'. Cray then is involved in the Brothers in Arms incident, as Craven goes after all the surviving members of Team 7. Cray also deals with alien forces (the Daemonites), who are pursuing keys to an ancient warship. On a Team 7 mission long ago, Cray had actually found one of the keys sticking up out of the mud and took it as a 'souvenir'.

Deathblow dies during the Fire From Heaven event, sacrificing himself in order to kill Damocles, the villain from that crossover.

After the events of Captain Atom: Armageddon and the Worldstorm, Deathblow was revived and began starring in his own series, Deathblow (vol. 2), written by Brian Azzarello with art by Carlos D'Anda.

During World's End, Deathblow is part of Stormwatch: Post Human Division leading missions on a post-apocalyptic Earth. It is also revealed that, despite being known as "powerless" in the Worldstorm continuity, his healing factor has evolved to a staggering level: because of his healing factor, he cannot die because his body keeps regenerating him, even after receiving wounds deep enough to shut down his biological functions. Jackson King suggested he could even regenerate "from a scrap of DNA."

Genevieve Cray
In the three-issue miniseries, Deathblow: Byblows (1999–2000), written by Alan Moore with art by Jim Baikie, it is revealed that I.O. created several variant clones of each Team 7 member, using the DNA collected from them without their knowledge. In the event of a Team 7 member's death, his clones are released in a simulated environment with the intention that only one survives to act as the member's replacement. However, the series is concerned with Deathblow's clones only. The clones were:

Genevieve Cray — a bald female and the series' protagonist
Klaus Cray — a cyborg
John-Joe and Joe-John Cray — two child clones
Michael Cray, Jr. — apparently a true clone
Damon Cray — a teenage clone
Caleb Cray — half-man, half-baboon
Judgment Cray — a clone with an extra Y chromosone
Gemma Cray — an expert poisoner
Cynthia Cray — a telepath and precognitive

All were killed by Judgment except for Genevieve, who killed Judgment and escaped from the laboratory where they were created, and Klaus Cray, who was captured by Genevieve and later killed by John-Joe and Joe-John Cray. Gemma, Cynthia, and Michael Cray, Jr., are never shown alive due to being killed by Judgment Cray before the protagonists discovered them. Genevieve later joined up with Sublime, Michael Cray's daughter, and a few of her DV8 teammates.

DC's The New 52
Deathblow appears for the first time in the DC reboot in Grifter'''s new series, making a team with Cheshire, but later was betrayed by her revealing she was an undercover agent for Helspont. Captured in Helspont's spaceship, he managed to escape and team up with Grifter to stop his plans.
 
Deathblow also appears in Teen Titans (vol. 4) #23.2: Deathstroke. He is first seen competing for an assassination with Deathstroke. The two men engage in combat, but Cray is overpowered and knocked down while Deathstroke finishes the job. He is later seen in Deathstroke's flashback, where Cray has Wilson's back in a battlefield while Wilson sets off a bomb. However, the detonation site turns out to be a children's hospital, which led to Wilson's resignation from the army.

The Wild Storm
Michael Cray is an IO operative for Miles Craven, sent to assassinate Jacob Marlowe, the head of Halolife Industries. The attempt thwarted by several unforeseen factors, such as Marlowe being an alien, the unexpected intervention of Angelica Spica, and Michael having superpowers he had not previously known about. While being questioned by Craven, Michael suddenly collapses. Having himself medically examined, Michael learns he has an inoperable brain tumor. Craven offers Michael continued medical support, provided Michael goes after Spica, but Michael begins to have qualms about his employer's motives on seeing a recording of Spica. Craven immediately withdraws any support and sends an assassination squad after Michael. With assistance from Christine Trelane, Michael is able to kill them, with Trelane offering him a new job.

Michael then moves to San Francisco, assisting Trelane's agenda while fighting malevolent versions of Oliver Queen, Barry Allen and Arthur Curry. While doing do, he discovers his powers and the tumor are the result of being implanted with Daemon biology many years ago, with the Daemon gaining increasing control over him. Michael becomes drawn into a plot involving a man named John Constantine and Diana Prince, who is convinced she is the daughter of the Greek gods and wishes to summon them to Earth. Finally acquiescing to the Daemon's control, Michael defeats Prince and leaves Trelane's employment.

Michael then returns to New York City during a mass outbreak of metahumans experimented on by IO and Skywatch. He intervenes in Marc Slayton's attempt on Craven's life, killing the man with his death touch. He tells Craven to leave him alone, but Craven, in the middle of a paranoid breakdown, shoots Michael through the head, instantly killing him.

Publications
A new Deathblow (vol. 2) series began on October 25, 2006, with the second issue out a month later. Issue #9 (February 2008) was the last issue of this series, ending with the 'death' of the character.

A 12-issue series titled Michael Cray'' was published by DC Comics under the Wildstorm imprint in 2017–2018.

Collected editions

Notes

References

External links
Review of issue #1
Review of issue #1, Comics Bulletin

1993 comics debuts
2006 comics debuts
DC Comics characters with accelerated healing
DC Comics military personnel
DC Comics telekinetics 
Wildstorm Universe superheroes
Characters created by Jim Lee
Comics by Jim Lee
Stormwatch and the Authority characters
Vigilante characters in comics